Anirudh Chandrasekar (born 11 July 1998) is an Indian tennis player.

Chandrasekar has a career high ATP singles ranking of 1014 achieved on 1 October 2018. He also has a career high doubles ranking of 144 achieved on 6 March 2023.

Chandrasekar has won 1 ATP Challenger doubles title at the 2023 Pune Challenger with Vijay Sundar Prashanth.

Tour finals

Doubles

References

External links
 
 

1998 births
Living people
Indian male tennis players
Sportspeople from Chennai